Andrea Routley is a Canadian writer. Her short story collection Jane and the Whales was a finalist for the Lambda Literary Award for Debut Fiction at the 26th Lambda Literary Awards in 2014.

She was a founder of the LGBT literary magazine Plenitude and of the Sunshine Coast's (Canada) Read Out Loud LGBT reading series, and was editor of the 2010 anthology Walk Myself Home: An Anthology to End Violence Against Women.

References

21st-century Canadian short story writers
Canadian women short story writers
Canadian magazine editors
University of Victoria alumni
Canadian LGBT writers
Writers from British Columbia
Living people
21st-century Canadian women writers
Women magazine editors
Year of birth missing (living people)
21st-century Canadian LGBT people